Lena Philipsson is a 1994 compilation album from Swedish pop singer Lena Philipsson.

Track listing
"Åh Amadeus"
"Vindarnas väg"
"Sommartid"
"När jag behöver dig som mest"
"Kärleken är evig"
"Segla"
"Boy"
"Oskuldens ögon"
"Dansa i neon"
"Jag känner (Ti Sento)"
"Det går väl an"
"Cheerio"

References

1994 compilation albums
Lena Philipsson compilation albums